Caprella verrucosa is a species of amphipod in the family Caprellidae. It is found in temperate Asia.

References

Amphipoda
Articles created by Qbugbot
Crustaceans described in 1872